Red Alert is a 1977 thriller television film directed by William Hale (as Billy Hale) and starring William Devane, Michael Brandon, Ralph Waite and Adrienne Barbeau. It was originally broadcast on the CBS Television Network.

Plot
When a leak of superheated water inside the containment area of a nuclear power plant erupts, PROTEUS, the computer orders the sealing off the compound, trapping 14 men inside. The plant managers had been warned of erratic readings of the core pressure prior to the emergency, but disregarded them, knowing that they would be changing the fuel rods the next day.

As the core temperature rises, and pressure drops, the reactor's managers realize that they are facing a possibility of a core meltdown, or even an explosion given the presence of combustible gases. Backup systems, meant to contain the situation, fail. Authorities call in “Commander” Stone, who in turn call in an emergency team of investigators led by Frank Bolen (William Devane). Bolen is dependable, mostly because the loss of his wife and son have allowed him to become fully focused on his job.

Bolen and Wyche arrive at the plant, and immediately clash with Commander Stone. Relying on PROTEUS, Stone discounts sabotage as a cause of the accident, believing human error as the more likely cause. In contrast, Bolen considers sabotage a better explanation for both the initial emergency and the failure of the backup systems.

Bolen's suspicions are raised when he learns that the wife of Howard Ives, one of the men trapped in the containment, has just been found dead, an apparent suicide. Visiting Ives's home, Bolen finds materials that could have been used to make a number of home-made bombs. When a sound resembling human breathing is overheard on speakers linked to the containment area, Bolen suspects that someone is still alive inside the reactor. One of the men on Bolen's team finds Ives's lunchbox, and discovers one of Ives's bombs inside. Bolen theorizes that Ives's plans to sabotage the reactor were derailed by a freak accident. A detailed investigation of Ives's use of PROTEUS shows that the plant worker had inquired as to the plant's various systems, essentially using the computer to teach him how circumvent its ability to protect the plant. Coupled with the recent death of Ives's daughter, a radical killed during a botched arrest, Ives's conduct convinces Bolen that they are facing an emergency partially based in sabotage.

Bolen realizes that he has no choice but to enter the reactor. If Ives is alive, they need him to explain where the remaining bombs are. Disobeying Stone's orders, Bolen enters the reactor area and finds that there's no radiation. Among the bodies of other workers, Bolen find that Ives is still alive. Before Bolen can extract information from Ives, he sees that an overhead crane has begun moving. Stone, remembering that the fuel rods were due to be changed, realizes that the crane, under computer control, is following its orders to open the reactor. Because the reactor is still “hot”, opening the reactor now will trigger a nuclear release. Bolen and Wyche struggle with the crane's hook, preventing it from opening the reactor containment vessel.

Cast
 William Devane as Frank Bolen
 Michael Brandon as Carl Wyche
 Adrienne Barbeau as Judy Wyche
 Ralph Waite as Henry Stone
 David Hayward as Larry Cadwell
 M. Emmet Walsh as Sheriff Sweeney
 Don Wiseman as Bill Yancy
 Don Rausch as Dryer
 John Martin as Ajax
 Howard Finch as Harry Holland
 Jim Siedow as Howard Ives
 Dan Ammerman as Rogers
 Charles Krohn as Parker
 Arnie Shayne as Business Man
 Charles J. Bailey as Airline Clerk
 Dixie Taylor as Mrs. Kerwin

Broadcast
The film aired on CBS, on May 18, 1977.

References

External links
 
 
 

1977 films
1970s thriller films
American disaster films
Anti-nuclear films
American thriller television films
Films directed by William Hale (director)
1970s American films